Paul Williams may refer to:

Entertainment
 Paul Williams (saxophonist) (1915–2002), American rhythm and blues saxophonist
 Paul Williams (The Temptations singer) (1939–1973), founding member of The Temptations
 Paul Williams (songwriter) (born 1940), songwriter for The Carpenters, The Muppets, film and television actor
 Paul Williams (British singer) (1940–2019), vocalist for Juicy Lucy, Tempest
 Paul Williams (director) (born 1943), American film and television director
 Paul L. Williams (author) (born 1944), FBI consultant, journalist
 Paul Williams (author) (born 1967), British author and consultant on ska music
 Paul Williams (journalist) (1948–2013), American founder of music magazine Crawdaddy!
 Paul Williams (media personality) (born 1964), Irish journalist and non-fiction crime writer
 Paul Williams (comedian) (born 1992), New Zealand comedian and singer-songwriter
 Paul Andrew Williams (born 1973), British film writer and director
 Paul O. Williams (1935–2009), American science-fiction author and poet
 Paul Williams (bluegrass musician), American bluegrass and gospel musician
 Paul Williams (composer), English composer and pianist
 Paul Williams (The Young and the Restless), character on The Young and the Restless
 Paul Williams (1934–2016), birth name of soul musician Billy Paul
Paul Williams, Australian actor in the film Sky Trackers

Politics
 Paul Williams (Conservative politician) (1922–2008), British MP for Sunderland South
 Paul Williams (health service manager) (born 1948), NHS Wales
 Paul Williams (Labour politician) (born 1972), British

Sports

Football and rugby
 Paul Williams (quarterback) (born 1963), American football player
 Paul Williams (wide receiver) (born 1983), for the Houston Texans
 Billy Williams (coach) (Paul Beauchamp Williams, 1892–1973), American college football, baseball, basketball coach
 Paul Williams (footballer, born 1962), English footballer
 Paul Williams (footballer, born 1965), English footballer
 Paul Williams (footballer, born 1969), English footballer
 Paul Williams (footballer, born 1970), English footballer
 Paul Williams (footballer, born 1971), English footballer and coach
 Paul Williams (Canadian football) (born 1947), Canadian football defensive back
 Paul Williams (Northern Ireland footballer) (born 1963), Northern Ireland footballer
 Paul Williams (Australian rules footballer) (born 1973), Australian rules footballer
 Paul Williams (rugby union) (born 1983), New Zealand
 Paul Williams (referee) (born 1985), New Zealand rugby union referee

Other sports
 Paul Williams (water polo) (born 1955), Australian Olympic water polo player
 Paul Williams (runner) (born 1956), Canadian
 Paul Williams (basketball) (born 1961), American
 Paul Williams (boxer) (born 1981), American professional boxer
 Paul Williams (sprinter) (born 1986), Grenadian
 Paul Williams (darts player) (born 1964), English

Other
 Paul L. Williams (general) (1894–1968), U.S. general in World War II
 Paul R. Williams (1894–1980), architect in Los Angeles, California
 Paul X. Williams (1908–1994), U.S. federal judge
 Paul S. Williams Jr. (1929-1995), American Army lieutenant general
 Paul Williams (Buddhist studies scholar) (born 1950), at the University of Bristol, UK
 Paul Williams (bishop) (born 1968), Bishop of Kensington
 Paul R. Williams (professor of law), peace negotiator

See also
 List of people with surname Williams